La Plata is a census-designated place  in San Juan County, New Mexico, United States. Its population was 612 as of the 2010 census. La Plata has a post office with ZIP code 87418. The community is located at the junction of state roads 170 and 574.

Demographics

Education 
Its school district is Farmington Municipal Schools.

References

Census-designated places in New Mexico
Census-designated places in San Juan County, New Mexico